Driggs is a city in the western United States in eastern Idaho, and is the county seat of Teton County. Part of the Jackson, WY-ID Micropolitan Statistical Area, it is located in Teton Valley, the headwaters of the Teton River. The population was 1,660 at the 2010 census, up from 1,100 in 2000. 

Located within city limits is the Driggs-Reed Memorial Airport, a class II airport that can accommodate private aircraft on its  runway.

History
The Teton Valley was discovered by John Colter in 1808, a member of the Lewis and Clark Expedition (1804–06). It later became known as Pierre's Hole, in honor of "le grand Pierre" Tivanitagon, and hosted the well-attended 1832 Rendezvous, which was followed by the Battle of Pierre's Hole.

Driggs was founded in 1888 by Benjamin Woodbury Driggs, Jr. and Don Carlos Driggs, whose descendants later moved to Arizona(where most live still), and there founded Western Savings and Loan. John Driggs, a descendant of Don Carlos Driggs, later became the mayor of Phoenix, Arizona in the 1970s.

In 2007, National Geographic magazine listed Driggs as one of the 10 best outdoor recreation destinations in the U.S.

Geography

Climate 
This climatic region is typified by large seasonal temperature differences, with warm summers and cold (sometimes severely cold) winters. According to the Köppen Climate Classification system, Driggs has a humid continental climate, abbreviated "Dfb" on climate maps. It has a surprising amount of seasonal lag for a place in the Rocky Mountains- more than what would be expected in the northeast.

Demographics

2010 census
As of the census of 2010, there were 1,660 people, 587 households, and 385 families residing in the village. The racial makeup of the city was 73.0% White, 0.5% African American, 0.2% Native American, 0.5% Asian, 0.4% Pacific Islander, 23.5% from other races, and 2.0% from two or more races. Hispanic or Latino of any race were 31.6% of the population.

There were 587 households, of which 40.7% had children under the age of 18 living with them, 50.6% were married couples living together, 9.5% had a female householder with no husband present, 5.5% had a male householder with no wife present, and 34.4% were non-families. 22.5% of all of the households were made up of individuals, and 5.2% had someone living alone who was 65 years of age or older. The average household size was 2.82 and the average family size was 3.40.

The median age in the city was 30.6 years. 29.2% of residents were under the age of 18; 9.1% were between the ages of 18 and 24; 33.9% were from 25 to 44; 20.5% were from 45 to 64; and 7% were 65 years of age or older. The gender makeup of the city was 51.4% male and 48.6% female.

2000 census
As of the census of 2000, there were 1,100 people, 386 households, and 252 families residing in the city. The racial makeup of the city was 83.73% White, 0.09% African American, 0.73% Native American, 0.73% Pacific Islander, 13.64% from other races, and 1.09% from two or more races. Hispanic or Latino of any race were 20.55% of the population.

There were 386 households, out of which 38.1% had children under the age of 18 living with them, 51.6% were married couples living together, 7.5% had a female householder with no husband present, and 34.5% were non-families. 23.3% of all households were made up of individuals, and 7.8% had someone living alone who was 65 years of age or older.  The average household size was 2.83 and the average family size was 3.44.

The population is spread over various age categories, with 30.5% under the age of 18, 10.8% from 18 to 24, 34.6% from 25 to 44, 15.9% from 45 to 64, and 8.2% who were 65 years of age or older.  The median age was 30 years. For every 100 females, there were 112.4 males.  For every 100 females age 18 and over, there were 114.3 males.

The median income for a household in the city was $33,750, and the median income for a family was $40,469. Males had a median income of $30,703 versus $19,722 for females. The per capita income for the city was $14,710.  About 7.0% of families and 11.2% of the population were below the poverty line, including 6.8% of those under age 18 and 11.6% of those age 65 or over.

Arts and culture

Sites and events in Driggs include:
 an art gallery
 Winter Snowfest, which includes a snow sculpture competition
 Teton Valley Hot Air Balloon Festival
 Shakespeare in the Park
 Plein Air Arts Festival
 Geotourism Center
 "Music on Main", a series of free, outdoor musical concerts during the summer
 SpudFest Family Film and Music Festival at Spud Drive-In Theater (2004-2008)

Parks and recreation

Recreation centers include Driggs Community Center, and an indoor climbing gym, plus a gymnastics gym.

Education
The public schools of Teton County are operated by Teton School District #401, headquartered in Driggs. The county's only traditional high school (Teton High School), middle school and upper elementary school are in Driggs.

Infrastructure

Transportation

Highway
 – SH-33 to Victor (south), and Tetonia (north)

Airports
Driggs-Reed Memorial Airport. (IATA: DIJ, ICAO: KDIJ, FAA LID: DIJ)

Notable people
Hendrika B. Cantwell (born 1925), clinical professor of pediatrics who advocated for abused and neglected children
Jeannine Davis-Kimball (1929–2017), archaeologist
Junius Driggs (1907-1994), banker
Leon M. Lederman (1922-2018), director of Fermi National Accelerator Laboratory; recipient of Nobel Prize in Physics
Dawn Wells (1938-2020), actress, lived part time in Driggs, Idaho. She was the original Mary Ann from Gilligan's Island, and also established SpudFest Family Film & Music Festival in Driggs, Idaho (2004-2008).

References

External links
 
 Teton Valley Chamber of Commerce

Cities in Idaho
Cities in Teton County, Idaho
County seats in Idaho
Jackson, Wyoming micropolitan area
Populated places established in 1888
1888 establishments in Idaho Territory